Second Cabinet of Marek Belka was appointed on 11 June 2004, passed the votes of confidence in parliament on 24 June 2004 and 15 October 2004.

The Cabinet

Belka, Marek, Second
Cabinet of Marek Belka, Second
2004 establishments in Poland
2005 disestablishments in Poland
Cabinets established in 2004
Cabinets disestablished in 2005